Uppal is a suburb in Eastern Hyderabad, Telangana, India. It is the mandal headquarters of Uppal mandal in Keesara revenue division in Medchal-Malkajgiri district. It forms Circle No.2 in the L. B. Nagar Zone of Greater Hyderabad Municipal Corporation. There are four wards i.e., Chilukanagar (7), Habsiguda (8), Ramanthapur (9) and Uppal (10) in this circle.

Etymology and history
It was a municipality prior to its merger into the Greater Hyderabad Municipal Corporation.
The words khurd and kalan were administrative terminology dating back to Mughal times, to differentiate two areas with the same name. Khurd means "small" and kalan means "big" are taken from Persian language.

Demographics 
 India census, Uppal Kalan had a population of 118,259. Males constitute 52% of the population and females 48%. Uppal Kalan has an average literacy rate of 73%, higher than the national average of 59.5%: male literacy is 80%, and female literacy is 66%. In Uppal Kalan, 12% of the population is under 6 years of age.

In 1991, it had a population of 78,644. The recorded growth rate of this area in 10 years (1991–2001) was about 56 percent.

Education 
St. Marks High School
Global Indian International School 
Little Flower Junior College
Aurora Technical Research  Institute

Transport 
Uppal metro station is located here.

Religious Place 
Qutub Shahi Mosque located on the main road of Uppal. dated back to 400 years  one of the biggest Mosques in Uppal

Karigiri Venkateshwara Swamy Temple located in Swaroop Nagar Colony is one of well known religious places.

Chilkanagar Church near Srinivasa heights very famous church in Uppal

See also 
 Uppal (Assembly constituency)

References 

Neighbourhoods in Hyderabad, India
Greater Hyderabad Municipal Corporation
Municipal wards of Hyderabad, India